Shuy Rural District is a rural district (dehestan) in the Central District of Baneh County, Kurdistan Province, Iran. At the 2006 census, its population was 8,381, in 1,665 families. The rural district has 32 villages.

References 

Rural Districts of Kurdistan Province
Baneh County